The 2009–10 Hartford Hawks women's basketball team represented the University of Hartford during the 2009–10 NCAA Division I women's basketball season. The team was coached by Jen Rizzotti. The 2009–10 season was one of the most successful seasons for Hartford, going undefeated in America East play and qualifying for the NCAA tournament for the fifth time in its history.

Roster

Schedule

|-
!colspan=9 style=| Non-conference regular season

|-
!colspan=9 style=| America East regular season

|-
!colspan=9 style=| America East Women's Tournament

|-
!colspan=9 style=| NCAA Women's Tournament

References

Hartford Hawks women's basketball seasons
Hartford
Hartford Hawks women's b
Hartford Hawks women's b